"Fear for Nobody" is a song by Italian group Måneskin. It was included in their debut album Il ballo della vita and released as a single on 11 January 2019 by Sony Music.

Music video
The music video for "Fear for Nobody", directed by Qwerty, premiered on 18 January 2019 via Måneskin's YouTube channel.

Charts

Certifications

References

2018 songs
2019 singles
Sony Music singles
Måneskin songs
Songs written by Damiano David
Songs written by Victoria De Angelis